The School of Architecture and Planning is one of seven schools in the University of the Witwatersrand, South Africa.

Academic degrees and diplomas
The school offers undergraduate and post-graduate degrees in Architecture, Urban and Regional and Development Planning, as well as a number of Interdisciplinary degrees. The school also offers post-graduate research degrees.

Architecture
 Bachelor of Architectural Studies (BAS)
 Bachelor of Architectural Studies with Honours, BAS (Hons)
 Master of Architecture (Professional)

Urban and Regional, and Development Planning
 Bachelor of Science Urban and Regional Planning (BSc URP)
 Bachelor of Science Honours Urban and Regional Planning (BSc Hons URP)
 Postgraduate Diploma in Planning (PG Dip)
 Master of Science in Development Planning (MSc DP)

Interdisciplinary post-graduate
 Master of Built Environment (MBE Housing)
 Master of Urban Design (MUD)
 Master of Architecture in Sustainable and Energy Efficient Cities (MArch SEEC)
 Master of Urban Studies (MUS)

Post-graduate research
 MSc Master of Town and Regional Planning (MSc TRP by research)
 Master of Architecture (MArch by research)
 PhD

Research Entities

Centre for Urbanism and Built Environment Studies (CUBES)
The School hosts the Centre for Urbanism and Built Environment Studies, a platform for urban research, learning and civic engagement.

In recent years the centre has focused on ’urban materialities’ and the place of the poor in South African cities, including how material realities of contemporary cities (their built environments at different scales, access to urban goods and central spaces, consternations about urban physical and political orders) affect urban citizens, particularly marginalized groups.

CUBES activities include collective research programmes, individual members’ expertise and institutional partnerships. CUBES organises urban research-oriented events, conferences, exhibitions and the Faces of the City Seminar series (run weekly, jointly with the NRF Chair on Spatial Change and the Gauteng City Region Observatory, GCRO). CUBES hosts workshops involving junior and senior researchers to enable focused discussion and mutual learning on identified research themes. CUBES runs community-oriented City Studios, which link research, engagement/activism and teaching/learning in the School.

References

Architecture and Planning
Architecture schools in South Africa
Urban studies and planning schools
Schools in Johannesburg
Educational institutions established in 1922
1922 establishments in South Africa